Matthew Dent (born 17 January 1972) is a former Australian rules footballer who played with Fitzroy, the Western Bulldogs and Hawthorn in the AFL.

Originally from South Australian National Football League (SANFL) club Sturt Dent was drafted by Fitzroy at the 1993 AFL Draft and made his senior AFL debut for Fitzroy in 1994, remaining with the club until their final season in 1996. Instead of joining the newly formed Brisbane Lions, Dent moved to Footscray and played four seasons with the Bulldogs before transferring to Hawthorn in 2001 to finish with a career tally of 118 games.

In 2002 Dent returned to Sturt and was a member of their 2002 premiership team.

External links

1972 births
Living people
Fitzroy Football Club players
Hawthorn Football Club players
Western Bulldogs players
Sturt Football Club players
Box Hill Football Club players
Australian rules footballers from South Australia